Phyllonorycter barbarella is a moth of the family Gracillariidae. It is found from the Iberian Peninsula and southern France.

The larvae feed on Quercus faginea and Quercus pubescens. They mine the leaves of their host plant. They create a lower-surface tentiform mine between two side veins. The mine can run over a vein or even the midrib.

External links
bladmineerders.nl
Fauna Europaea

barbarella
Moths of Europe
Moths described in 1901